Acrotaeniacantha radiosa is a species of tephritid or fruit flies in the genus Acrotaeniacantha of the family Tephritidae.

Distribution
Venezuela.

References

Tephritinae
Insects described in 1939
Diptera of South America